The Passíusálmar or Passion Hymns are a collection of 50 poetic texts written by the Icelandic minister and poet, Hallgrímur Pétursson. The texts explore the Passion narrative, as traditionally presented, from the point where Christ enters the Garden of Gethsemane to his death and burial. Hallgrímur began composing the work in 1656, while serving as pastor of Saurbær in Hvalfjörður. It took him three years to complete, the final poem being written in May 1659; the first edition was published seven years later, in 1666. By the end of the century they had become so popular in Iceland that five editions had been published. Since that time, they have been reprinted more than 75 times, a unique achievement in Icelandic literature. The poems were translated into many other languages, including Latin, English, Chinese and Danish.

The first English edition was published in 1913.  In the 1950s a new translation was made by Arthur Charles Gook.  This new translation received the imprimatur of the Bishop of Iceland, Sigurbjörn Einarsson, and is published by Hallgrímskirkja. In addition, a selection of texts were translated by Anglican Bishop Charles Venn Pilcher and published in a pamphlet entitled "Thirty-One Meditations on Christ's Passion"; this translation, although incomplete, is regarded as more faithful to Hallgrímur's Lutheran theology.

The Passíusálmar quickly became an important part of Icelandic religious expression, being sung or read during Lent in every Icelandic home; today, they are broadcast on the radio during that time of year.  They have been set to music by many composers of Icelandic church music, including Þorkell Sigurbjörnsson and Jón Hlöðver Áskelsson, but use outside Iceland is rare.

Titles of the 50 hymns
Hymn I. Christ goes to the Garden

Hymn II. Christ's Suffering in the Garden

Hymn III. “Sorrowful, even unto Death”

Hymn IV. Christ's Appeals to His Disciples

Hymn V. The Jews arrive in the Garden

Hymn VI. Judas' Kiss and Christ's Arrest

Hymn VII. Peter's Defence and Malchus' Wounded Ear

Hymn VIII. Christ's Address to the Jews

Hymn IX. The Flight of the Disciples

Hymn X. The First Enquiry before Caiaphas

Hymn XI. Peter's Denial

Hymn XII. Peter's Repentance

Hymn XIII. The False Witnesses and Caiaphas' Judgment

Hymn XIV. The Soldiers mock Christ

Hymn XV. The Priests' Conference

Hymn XVI. The Remorse of Judas

Hymn XVII. The Potter's Field

Hymn XVIII. The Jews' First Charge before Pilate

Hymn XIX. Christ's Confession before Pilate

Hymn XX. The Jews' Second Charge before Pilate

Hymn XXI. Herod's Curiosity and the Gorgeous Robe

Hymn XXII. The Demand for Crucifixion 

Hymn XXIII. The Scourging of Christ

Hymn XXIV. The Scarlet Robe and Crown of Thorns

Hymn XXV. Christ led from the Judgment Hall

Hymn XXVI. Christ and Pilate

Hymn XXVII. Pilate and the Jews

Hymn XXVIII. Pilate's unjust Judgment

Hymn XXIX. Release of Barabbas

Hymn XXX. Christ bears His Cross

Hymn XXXI. Christ's Address to the Women

Hymn XXXII. The Green and the Dry Tree

Hymn XXXIII. The Crucifixion of Christ

Hymn XXXIV. The First Cry from the Cross

Hymn XXXV. The Superscription on the Cross

Hymn XXXVI. Christ's Garments divided

Hymn XXXVII. The Second Cry from the Cross

Hymn XXXVIII. The Mocking suffered on the Cross

Hymn XXXIX. The Thief's Repentance

Hymn XL. The Third Cry from the Cross

Hymn XLI. The Fourth Cry from the Cross

Hymn XLII. The Fifth Cry from the Cross

Hymn XLIII. The Sixth Cry from the Cross

llvmn XLIV. The Seventh Cry from the Cross

Hymn XLV. The Death of Christ

Hymn XLVI. The Signs that accompanied His Death

Hymn XLVII. Christ's Friends, who stood far off

Hymn XLVIII. The Saviour's wounded Side

Hymn XLIX. The Burial of Christ

Hymn L. The Guard on Watch

Lutheran hymnals
Lutheran hymns
Passion hymns
Icelandic literature
Caiaphas
Gethsemane
Works based on the New Testament